Connor O'Brien, 2nd Viscount Clare ( – 1670) was the son of Daniel O'Brien, 1st Viscount Clare and Catherine FitzGerald, a daughter of Gerald, 14th Earl of Desmond.

Birth and origins 

Connor was born about 1605, the second son of Daniel O'Brien and his wife Catherine FitzGerald. His father was the 1st Viscount Clare. His father's family, the O'Briens, were a Gaelic Irish dynasty that descended from Brian Boru, medieval high king of Ireland.

Connor's mother was the widow of Maurice Roche, 6th Viscount Fermoy and the third daughter of Gerald FitzGerald, 14th Earl of Desmond, and his second wife, Eleanor Butler. Connor was one of 11 siblings, who are listed in his father's article.

Marriage and children 
O'Brien married Honora O'Brien, daughter of Daniel O'Brien of Duagh, County Kerry, and his wife Ellen FitzGerald, a daughter of the Knight of Glin.

 
Connor and Honora had a son:
 Daniel (died 1691), his successor

—and six daughters:
 Margaret, married Hugh O'Reilly
 Ellen, married Sir Roger Shagnessy
 Honora, married John FitzGerald, 13th Knight of Kerry
 Catherine, married 1st Garret FitzGerald of Castleishen abd 2ndly  John MacNamara
 Sarah married Daniel Sullivan Bear
 Mary married a Power of Doonil, whose first name in unknown

Later life, death, and timeline 
On 11 July 1662 when Charles II created his father Baron Moyarta and Viscount Clare, O'Brien gained the courtesy title of Baron Moyarta. On his father's death, which happened in 1663 or in 1666, Moyarta, as he was now, succeeded as the 2nd Viscount Clare.

Clare enjoyed his new title only a few years as he died about 1670. He was succeeded by his eldest son Daniel.

Notes and references

Notes

Citations

Sources 
 
 
  – (for Thomond)
 
  – N to R (for Ormond)
  – S to T (for Thomond)
  – Canonteign to Cutts (for Clare)
 
  – 1625 to 1655
  – (for timeline)
 
 
 
 
  – 1641 to 1643

1605 births
1670 deaths
17th-century Irish people
Connor
People from County Clare
Viscounts in the Peerage of Ireland